Eyyub Yaqubov (born April 26, 1965, Baku, Azerbaijan SSR, USSR) is a popular Azerbaijani singer. He is widely known for bringing the Baku chanson genre to popularity in 1992.

Discography
1999 - Duet Amburan
2000 - Aghabala Chaykovsky
2001 - Ana
2002 - Eyyub Yaqubov
2003 - Unutdun
2003 - Sechmeler
2003 - Odin Raz Zhivem
2004 - Alishdim
2006 - Extra

References

External links
Facebook page
Instagram page
YouTube channel

21st-century Azerbaijani male singers
Musicians from Baku
Living people
1965 births
Azerbaijani pop singers